Milan Janša (born 26 September 1965 in Jesenice) is a former Slovenian rower and Olympic medallist at the 1992 Summer Olympics. He competed in four consecutive Summer Olympics, starting in 1988 for Yugoslavia.

References

1965 births
Living people
Yugoslav male rowers
Slovenian male rowers
Olympic rowers of Slovenia
Olympic rowers of Yugoslavia
Rowers at the 1988 Summer Olympics
Rowers at the 1992 Summer Olympics
Rowers at the 1996 Summer Olympics
Rowers at the 2000 Summer Olympics
Olympic bronze medalists for Slovenia
Olympic medalists in rowing
Sportspeople from Jesenice, Jesenice
World Rowing Championships medalists for Slovenia
Medalists at the 1992 Summer Olympics
World Rowing Championships medalists for Yugoslavia